Johanna is a 2005 Hungarian musical film directed by Kornél Mundruczó. It was screened in the Un Certain Regard section at the 2005 Cannes Film Festival. The plot of the film is a retelling of story of Joan of Arc set in a hospital. The musical character of the film is operatic, with the characters speaking entirely in song, with two main characters being dubbed by singers.

Cast
 Orsolya Tóth - Johanna (as Orsi Tóth)
 Eszter Wierdl - Johanna's Voice
 Zsolt Trill - Young Doctor
 Tamás Kóbor - Young Doctor's Voice
 Dénes Gulyás - Professor
 József Hormai - 1st Doctor
 Sándor Kecskés - 2nd Doctor
 Viktória Mester - 1st Nurse
 Hermina Fátyol - 2nd Nurse
 Andrea Meláth - 3rd Nurse
 Kálmán Somody - Cleaning Man
 János Klézli - Fireman
 Géza Gábor - Patient
 Kolos Kováts - Patient
 Sándor Egri - Patient
 István Gantner - Liver Patient

References

External links

2005 films
Hungarian musical drama films
2000s Hungarian-language films
Sung-through musical films
Films directed by Kornél Mundruczó
2000s musical drama films
2005 drama films